Some Indigenous Australians are remembered in history for leadership prior to European colonisation, some for their resistance to that colonisation, others for assisting Europeans explore the country. Some became infamous for their deeds, and others noted as the last of their communities.

Prior to 1788
 Cumbo Gunnerah – 18th century leader of the Kamilaroi people near Gunnedah, New South Wales

1788–1888
 William Barak (1824–1903) – ngurungaeta of Wurundjeri, police tracker, then artist
 Bennelong – representative of the Eora People at the time Port Jackson was settled
 Billibellary (1799–1846) – ngurungaeta of the Wurundjeri-willam clan
 Calyute – leader of the Pindjarup people at the time of the Battle of Pinjarra
 Derrimut – Bunurong elder during European settlement of Melbourne
Dundalli (1820–1855) – Resistance leader in South East Queensland during European Settlement
Jackey Jackey – assisted Edmund Kennedy expedition into Cape York and awarded solid silver breastplate for heroic deeds.
 Jandamarra – Bunuba man who resisted European occupation
 William Lanne – King Billy, last surviving male of the Oyster Cove clan of Tasmanian Aborigines
 Mannalargenna – Tasmanian Aboriginal Person of the Plangermaireener people
 Mokare – Noongar guide and peacemaker
 Johnny Mullagh – Aboriginal cricketer who was known for his remarkable performance in the 1868 Aborigine cricket team's tour of England. 
 Musquito – originally from Sydney, became a bushranger following transportation to Tasmania
 Tommy Windich – Western Australian explorer
 Pemulwuy – member of the Eora people (Botany Bay) area
 Fanny Cochrane Smith – first Tasmanian Aboriginal Person born on Flinders Island
 Truganini – last surviving full-blooded Tasmanian Aboriginal Person
 Tullamareena – member of Wirundgeri, Melbourne
 Simon Wonga (1824–1874) – ngurungaeta of the Wurundjeri people around Melbourne who secured land at Coranderrk, and the suburb Wonga Park was named after him
 Yagan – Western Australian leader in 1830s
 Wylie – Aboriginal guide who stayed with Edward John Eyre in their crossing of the Nullarbor
 Mullawirraburka – Kaurna leader preserving his language and culture during colonisation

1888 onwards
 Billy Drumley (1853–1951) – community leader
 Nemarluk – leader of the Chul-a-mar, who fought European and Japanese around Darwin in the early 20th century
Umbarra (King Merriman) – late 19th century elder of the Yuin around Bermagui, New South Wales
1914 Cissy McLeod
1911 'Neighbour' awarded the Albert Medal for Lifesaving
Marion Leane Smith – First World War nurse

References

 
Indigenous Australian historical figures
Historical figures